Mixed doubles curling at the 2012 Winter Youth Olympics was held from January 20 to 22 at the Innsbruck Exhibition Centre in Innsbruck, Austria.

Teams
The teams consisted of athletes from the mixed team tournament, one boy and one girl from different NOCs. The teams were selected by the organizing committee based on the final ranking from the mixed team competition in a way that balanced out the teams, and were assigned on January 19. The players in each pair were then allowed time to train together.

The teams are listed as follows:

Knockout results

Finals

Top Half

Bottom Half

Knockout results
All draw times are listed in Central European Time (UTC+01).

Round of 32

Draw 1
Friday, January 20, 9:00

Draw 2
Friday, January 20, 12:30

Dropkin and Verenich scored a perfect 6 points in the sixth end, marking the first time in Youth Olympics history that a perfect end of curling was scored.

Draw 3
Friday, January 20, 16:00

Draw 4
Friday, January 20, 19:30

Round of 16

Draw 1
Saturday, January 21, 9:00

Draw 2
Saturday, January 21, 13:00

Quarterfinals
Saturday, January 21, 17:00

Semifinals
Sunday, January 22, 9:00

Bronze Medal Game
Sunday, January 22, 13:00

Gold Medal Game
Sunday, January 22, 13:00

References

External links
Innsbruck 2012 – Curling Home

2012 in curling
Curling at the 2012 Winter Youth Olympics
Olympics